Cheonjeyeon Waterfall is a three-tier waterfall located on Jeju Island. Cold water flows out of the ceiling of a cave to make the waterfall. Between the precipice of the waterfall and the lower clay layer, water springs out. From there, the water goes to the second waterfall and falls  and continues to the third waterfall. Eventually, the water reaches the ocean. Cheonjeyeon means Pond of the Emperor of Heaven. According to Korean legend, seven nymphs would descend from the heavens at night and bathe in the waterfall's pond. The falls are a popular tourist attraction on Jeju-do. 

The warm temperate forest around Cheonjeyeon Waterfall was designated Natural Monument No. 378 in 1993 because of the rare plants it contains and its value for scientific research. Rare plants such as the solipnan (솔잎난) plants or skeleton fork fern (Psilotum nudum) can be found around the falls in the crevices of rocks. 

Since ancient times, it is thought that standing under the waterfall on the 15th day of the seventh lunar month can cure diseases by the eighth lunar month, though swimming is now prohibited. On the May of even-numbered years, the Chilseonyeo (Seven Nymphs) Festival is held at this location. The waterfall is one of the three famous waterfalls of Jeju, the other two being Cheonjiyeon Waterfall and Jeongbang Waterfall.

Above the falls is Seonimgyo Bridge, which symbolizes the legend of Cheonjeyeon.

See also
Jeju-do

References

External links
Cheonjeyeon Waterfall on YouTube

Waterfalls of South Korea